Saint-Léger-Vauban is a commune in the Yonne department in Bourgogne-Franche-Comté in north-central France.

It lies within the Parc naturel régional du Morvan.

Geography
The town is situated between Rouvray and Quarré-les-Tombes. The nearest large town is Avallon.

History
The town was originally named Saint Leger, then Saint-Léger-de-Fourcheret until 1867, when Napoleon III issued an Imperial decree renaming it Saint-Léger-de-Vauban, after the French military engineer Vauban, who was born there in 1633.

Sights
The church was restored in 1865 and has a functional bell tower. Saint-Léger-Vauban is also home to the Abbaye de la Pierre Qui Vire, and the Chateau de Rueres.

Economy
Saint-Léger's primary economic activity is farming, though there are several small shops, a post office, school, and multiple cheese makers.

See also
 List of places named after people
Communes of the Yonne department

References

External links

 Official website 

Communes of Yonne